Locomotive classification on the Pennsylvania Railroad took several forms.  Early on, steam locomotives were given single-letter classes. As the 26 letters were quickly assigned, that scheme was abandoned for a more complex system. This was used for all of the PRR's steam locomotives, and — with the exception of the final type bought (the E44) — all electric locomotives also used this scheme.

PRR steam and electric classification

A: 0-4-0 

Class A was the 0-4-0 type, an arrangement best suited to small switchers.  Most railroads abandoned the 0-4-0 after the 1920s, but the PRR kept it for use on small industrial branches, especially those with street trackage and tight turns.

 A1
 A2
 A3
 A4
 A5s
 A6

B: 0-6-0 

Class B comprised the 0-6-0 type, the most popular arrangement for switchers on the PRR.

 B1
 B2
 B3
 B4
 B5 - Rebuilt from class H1 and H2a 2-8-0
 B6
 B7 - Some rebuilt from class H3, H3a, and H3b 2-8-0
 B8
 B21
 B22
 B23
 B28s
 B29

C: 0-8-0 

Class C was assigned to the 0-8-0 type.  These were very common on other railroads, but the PRR was not keen on them and only built a few.  This was partly because the PRR used 2-8-0 "Consolidation" types for similar service.

 C1 - Largest 2-cylinder 0-8-0 ever built
 C29
 C30
 C31

D: 4-4-0 

Class D was the 4-4-0 "American" type, the most common arrangement in 19th Century American railroading.  4-4-0s stayed in service on the PRR in secondary work later than on most other railroads, and three were in use until after World War II

 D1
 D2
 D3
 D4
 D5
 D6
 D7
 D8
 D9
 D10
 D11
 D12
 D13
 D14
 D15 - Compound
 D16
 D21 - ex-Vandalia Railroad, built by Baldwin 1871-1873
 D22 - ex-Vandalia Railroad, built by Pittsburgh 1883-1889
 D23 - ex-Vandalia Railroad, built by Pittsburgh 1884
 D24 - ex-Vandalia Railroad, built by Rogers 1887
 D25 - ex-Vandalia Railroad, built by Pittsburgh 1890
 D26 - ex-Vandalia Railroad, built by Schenectady 1895-1899
 D30 - ex-Toledo, Walhonding Valley and Ohio Railroad, built by Rome 1890
 D31 - ex-Toledo, Walhonding Valley and Ohio Railroad, built 1892-1895
 D32 - Compound, ex-Toledo, Walhonding Valley and Ohio Railroad, built by Baldwin 1892
 D33
 D34 - ex-Cleveland and Marietta Railroad, built by Rome 1885
 D35 - ex-Cleveland and Marietta Railroad, built by Rome 1885
 D36 - ex-Cleveland and Marietta Railroad, built by Rogers 1885-1886
 D37 - ex-Cincinnati, Lebanon and Northern Railway, built by Baldwin 1894
 D38 - ex-Cincinnati, Lebanon and Northern Railway, built by Pittsburgh 1899
 D39 - ex-Grand Rapids and Indiana Railroad, built by Baldwin 1892-1893
 D61 - ex-Cleveland, Akron and Columbus Railway, built by Baldwin 1893
 "Odd D" #10003, an experimental electric locomotive.

E: 4-4-2 

The 4-4-2 "Atlantic" type was assigned class E.  The PRR was an enthusiastic user of the Atlantic type in flatter country, and built some of the most advanced Atlantics used in the United States.

 E1
 E2
 E3
 E4
 E5
 E6
 E7
 E21
 E22
 E23
 E28 - Compound
 E29 - Compound
 "de Glehn" #2512, a single experimental compound locomotive

F: 2-6-0 

The 2-6-0 "Mogul" type was assigned class F.  On the PRR, this type was used during the period of 1895–1925, approximately.  They were mostly used to haul express freight, although some hauled suburban passenger trains.

 F1
 F2 - Compound
 F3
 F21
 F22
 F23
 F24
 F25
 F26
 F27
 F30
 F31
 F61

G: 4-6-0 

 G1
 G2
 G3
 G4
 G5 - Largest 10 wheeler built.  PRR constructed 90 for use in commuter service and then built 30 for their subsidiary the Long Island RR.
 G53 - Owned By subsidiary Long Island RR

H: 2-8-0 

 H1
 H2
 H3
 H4
 H5
 H6
 H8
 H9
 H10

I: 2-10-0 

The 2-10-0 "Decapod" type was assigned class I.  The PRR only owned one type of Decapod, class I1s, but they owned 598 of them, one of the largest classes of identical power in the United States.

 I1s - heavy freight hauler.

J: 2-6-2 and 2-10-4 

Class J was first used for two experimental 2-6-2 "Prairie" locomotives built by ALCO in 1905.  These were both withdrawn from service by the mid-1920s.  In 1942, the PRR built 123 2-10-4 "Texas" type locomotives based on C&O plans; class J now being unoccupied, it was reused for them. The PRR J1 was an improved version of its C&O counterpart with more pulling power.

 J1 - 2-10-4 freight locomotives.
 J28 - experimental 2-6-2 locomotives.

K: 4-6-2 

The PRR assigned class K to the 4-6-2 "Pacific" type.  The Pacific was the most common type of passenger locomotive on the Pennsylvania.

 K2 - 153 built at Altoona 1910-1911
 K3s - 30 built by Baldwin in 1913.
 K4s - 425 built by the PRR and Baldwin 1914-1928.
 K5 - 2 prototypes built

L: 2-8-2 

Class L was assigned to the 2-8-2 "Mikado" type.

 L1s - freight twin to the famed K4s Pacific (575 built)
 L2s - the USRA standard light Mikado (5 built for PRR).
 L5 - PRR 2nd generation DC electric locomotive.
 L6 - PRR freight AC electric locomotives.

M: 4-8-2 

 M1 - mixed-traffic Mountain type, latterly mostly used on fast freight.

N: 2-10-2 

 N1s - Lines West heavy freight locomotive.
 N2s - USRA Standard 2-10-2, also used on Lines West.

O: 4-4-4 

The 4-4-4 arrangement was rare anywhere, and on the PRR it was found only on eight experimental electric locomotives.

 O1 - experimental electric locomotives.

P: 4-6-4 

The 4-6-4 arrangement was seen on the PRR only on electric locomotives.  As a steam locomotive arrangement, it was poorly suited to the PRR's mountainous terrain, wasting much potential adhesive weight on non-driven wheels.  That it was so widely used by the rival New York Central would also likely have factored against PRR adoption.

 P5 - mixed-traffic electric locomotive, succeeded by the GG1.

Q: 4-4-6-4 or 4-6-4-4 

The Q class comprised what were effectively 4-10-4s with the driving axles split into two driven groups.  The Q2 was the most powerful non-articulated steam locomotive ever built and also holds the record for highest horsepower recorded by any steam locomotive at 7,987 hp.

 Q1 - experimental duplex freight locomotive.
 Q2 - duplex freight locomotive.

R: 4-8-4 

The PRR never built any steam locomotives of the 4-8-4 "Northern" type, although the T1 duplexes were effectively a "Northern" with the driving wheels split into two groups.

 R1 - experimental electric locomotive, surpassed by the GG1.

S: 6-4-4-6 or 6-8-6 

Both S class locomotives were originally intended to only have four leading and trailing wheels, but for the S1 increases in weight required an additional axle at each end. In the case of the S2, it was due to wartime limits on the use of advanced steel alloys.

 S1 - experimental duplex express passenger locomotive.
 S2 - experimental steam turbine locomotive.

T: 4-4-4-4 

The duplex-drive T1 was the final class of steam locomotive constructed for the Pennsylvania Railroad, and possibly the most controversial.

 T1 - Duplex express passenger locomotive.

Compound classifications 

The PRR classified articulated locomotives and joined locomotive units by using multiples of the previous classifications.

Non-Articulated steam:

 1320 - 2-2-2-0 locomotive, based on the London and North Western Railway's Dreadnought Class locomotive.  One built.

Articulated steam:

 CC1s - 0-8-8-0 Mallet locomotive.  Treated as two 0-8-0s for classification.  One built.
 CC2s - 0-8-8-0 Mallet locomotive.  10 built.
 FG1 - What could have been the PRR's version of the Norfolk & Western class A 2-6-6-4 simple articulated locomotive.  Never built.
 HC1s - 2-8-8-0 simple articulated locomotive.  The PRR's only main-line articulated.  One built.
 HH1s - 2-8-8-2 Mallet locomotive.  Treated for classification purposes as two 2-8-0s back to back.
 HH1 - 2-8-8-2 Norfolk & Western class Y3 borrowed by PRR during World War II.

Articulated electric:

 AA1 - experimental 0-4-4-0 or B-B electric locomotives.
 BB1 - two-unit prototype AC electric 0-6-0+0-6-0 switching locomotive, later split into single units as class B1.
 BB2 - two-unit 0-6-0+0-6-0 DC electric switching locomotives, later split into single units as class B1.
 BB3 - two-unit 0-6-0+0-6-0 DC electric switching locomotives for LIRR, later split into single units as class B3.
 DD1 - two-unit DC electric locomotive, two 4-4-0 half-locomotives semi-permanently coupled back to back.  Served between Manhattan Transfer and Penn Station, and to Sunnyside Yard.
 DD2 - experimental mixed-traffic AC electric locomotive, similar in overall design and appearance to GG1.
 FF1 - 2-6-6-2 (1-C+C-1) experimental electric locomotive, 1917.  Too powerful.
 FF2 - 2-6-6-2 motor-generator AC electric locomotives acquired second-hand from the Great Northern Railway (their classes Y1 and Y1a) in 1956.
 GG1 - express passenger and freight electric locomotive, highly successful.

Non-standard electric classification 

 E2b - experimental B-B General Electric-built AC electric locomotives (3 pairs built).
 E3b - experimental B-B-B Baldwin-Lima-Hamilton-Westinghouse AC/DC rectifier locomotives (1 pair built).
 E2c - experimental C-C Baldwin-Lima-Hamilton-Westinghouse AC/DC rectifier locomotives (1 pair built)
 E44 - 1960 C-C General Electric AC/DC rectifier freight locomotives.

The horsepower-based designation unique to the E44 would be retained and expanded by Penn Central to cover the former New Haven EF4s (E33) and EP5s (E40).

Diesel classification

The Pennsylvania Railroad was slow to dieselize. By the end of WW2 they only had 18 units. However over the next 22 years they had acquired a total of 3005 units. They bought from all the manufacturers: Alco 516 units, Baldwin 643 units, EMD 1,479 units, Fairbanks-Morse 200 units, General Electric 145 units, and Lima 22 units. This diversity was a nightmare for the maintenance department as there was very little compatibility amongst the different builders. 
The class number system is as follows:
The first letter stood for the manufacturer; A=Alco, B =Baldwin, G =General Electric, E =EMD, F =Fairbanks-Morse, and L =Lima.
The second and third letters represented the type of service; S =switcher, F =Freight, P =passenger, :: PF=dual service, RS =road-switcher, and H =helper.
The next number(s) were for horse power rounded to hundreds.
The last letter, if used, was for model variations.

Alco

Baldwin Locomotive Works

General Electric

EMD

Fairbanks-Morse

References

 
Locomotive classification systems
Railway locomotive-related lists